Ortaca is a town and district of Muğla Province, Turkey.

Ortaca is a Turkish word that may refer to the following places in Turkey:

 Ortaca, Çanakkale
 Ortaca, Gerede, a village in the district of Gerede, Bolu Province
 Ortaca, Gerger, a village in the district of Gerger, Adıyaman Province
 Ortaca, Kozluk, a village in the district of Kozluk, Batman Province
 Ortaca, Söğüt, a village in the district of Söğüt, Bilecik Province
 Ortacalar, Arhavi, a village in the district of Arhavi, Artvin Province